This is a list of people from Blackpool. Blackpool is a seaside town and unitary authority in Lancashire, in the North West England.

Academia and research
Valerie Austin (born 1948), hypnotherapist and writer

Arts and entertainment

Joe-Warren Plant (born 2002), actor
Bill Ashton (born 1936), jazz saxophonist and composer
David Atherton (born 1944), conductor
David Ball (born 1959), music producer and musician
Zoë Ball (born 1970), television and radio presenter
Steve Barker (born 1971), film director and screenwriter
Lennie Bennett (1938–2009), comedian and television presenter
Cathryn Bradshaw, born 1964 actress theatre, television, radio, film
Charlie Cairoli (1910–1980), Italian-born clown based in Blackpool
Roy Calley, journalist
Frank Carson, Northern Irish comedian based in Blackpool
Peter Chelsom (born 1956), film director and actor
Jenna-Louise Coleman (born 1986), actress
Robert Crampton (born 1964), journalist
John Evan (born 1948), musician
Horace Finch (1906-1980), pianist and organist
Sonny Flood (born 1989), actor
Judy Flynn (born 1963/1964), actress
Dan Forshaw (born 1981), musician
Karima Francis singer-songwriter
Errol Fuller (born 1947), author and painter
Hamish Hamilton (born 1966), concert and award ceremony director
Jeffrey Hammond (born 1946), musician
Roy Harper (born 1941), musician
Barney Harwood (born 1979), television presenter
Emilios Hatjoullis (born 1939), cartoonist and graphic designer
John Inman (1935-2007), actor known for Are You Being Served?
Curtis Jobling (born 1972), illustrator and animator
Patrick Keiller (born 1950), film director
Jacqueline Leonard (born 1965), actress
Little Boots (Victoria Hesketh, born 1984), singer-songwriter
Syd Little (born 1942), come (born 1955), singer
Chris Lowe (born 1959), musician
John Mahoney (born 1940), US actor (born in Bispham)
Nicholas McCarthy (born 1974), musician
Tania Mallet (born 1941), model and actress
Keith Marsh (born 1926), actor
Gary Miller (1924–1968), singer and actor
Pauline Moran, actress
Rae Morris (born 1992), singer-songwriter
David Morley (born 1964), poet
Janet Munro (1934–1972), actress
Sarah Myerscough, sculptor
Graham Nash (1942), singer-songwriter
Bernadette Nolan (born 1960), Irish-born singer and actress
Coleen Nolan (born 1965), singer and television presenter
Russell Payne (born 1971), writer
Jodie Prenger (born 1979), singer and actress
Maddy Prior (born 1947), singer
John Robb (born 1961), musician, TV presenter, author 
Ted Rhodes, script editor
Barbara Robotham (1936–2013), opera singer and distinguished voice teacher
Carol Royle (born 1954), actress
Nikki Sanderson (born 1984), actress and model
Robert Smith (born 1959), musician
John Sumner (born 1951), actor
Hayley Tamaddon, actress
David Thewlis (born 1963), actor
Darrell Till (born 1975), singer-songwriter
Vicki-Lee Walberg, model
John Watson, comic book artist
Chris Wiggins (born 1931), actor
Tony Williams (born 1947), musician
Adrian Blacow, musician (alias VHS Head)
Tim Woolcock (born 1952), painter
Lucy Fallon (born 1995), actress
Aiden Grimshaw (born 1991), singer
Jake Roche (born 1992), singer
Craig Parkinson (born 1976), actor
Ricky Tomlinson (actor, The Royle Family) born 26 September 1939 in Bispham, Blackpool, raised in Liverpool)
Tom Gregory (born 1995), singer

Business
Mike Bateson, former football club chairman
William Lyons (1901–1985), co-founder of the Swallow Sidecar Company

Military
John Schofield (VC) (1892–1918), soldier and Victoria Cross recipient

Politics, government and legal
George Carman (1929–2001), barrister
Neil Fletcher (born 1944), politician
Tom McNally (born 1943), politician

Science and health
Sheila Quinn (born 1920), nurse
Michael Smith (1932–2000), biochemist

Sports
William Anderton (born 1879), footballer
Jimmy Armfield (born 1935), footballer
Paul Askham (born 1962), figure skater
Tom Barkhuizen (born 1993), footballer 
Malcolm Barrass (born 1924), footballer
Chris Beech (born 1974), footballer and coach
Matthew Blinkhorn (born 1985), footballer
Jamie Burns (born 1984), footballer
Joe Bullock (rugby league), (born 1992), rugby player
Paul Burgess (groundskeeper) (born 1978), groundskeeper
Alan Burton (born 1991), footballer
James Cahill (born 1995), snooker player 
Joe Cardle (born 1987), footballer
Louis Cardwell (1912–1986), footballer
Matthew Cassidy (born 1988), footballer 
Ronnie Clayton (1923–2007), boxer
Harry Cookson (1869–1922), footballer
Kenny Cooper, Sr. (born 1946), footballer and coach
Billy Crellin (born 2000), footballer
Steven Croft (born 1984), cricketer
Ciaran Donnelly (born 1984), footballer
Teddy Duckworth (born 1882), footballer
Dave Durie (born 1931), footballer
George Eastham (born 1936), footballer
George Eastham, Sr. (1914–2000), footballer and manager
 Dave Edge (born 1954), British-Canadian Olympic long-distance runner
Lester Ellis (born 1965), boxer
Andy Gouck (born 1972), footballer
Peter Harding (1924–2007), rock climber
Steve Harrison, footballer, manager and coach
Steve Hill (born 1940), footballer
John Hills (born 1978), footballer
Micky Holmes (born 1965), footballer
John Hurst (born 1947), footballer
Herbert Jones (1896–1973), footballer
Matty Kay (born 1989), footballer
Darran Kempson (born 1984), footballer
Roger Kenyon (born 1949), footballer
Graham Lancashire (born 1972), footballer
Brian London (1934–2021), boxer originally from Hartlepool
Andrew Lyons (born 1966), footballer
Gavin McCann (born 1978), footballer
Ben Marsden (born 1979), field hockey player
Barrie-Jon Mather (born 1973), rugby player
Darren Matthews (born 10 May 1968), Professional wrestler (Known as William Regal or Lord Steven Regal) 
Jamie Milligan (born 1980), footballer
Kevin Moore (born 1956), footballer
Lee Morris (born 1980), footballer
Reginald Neal (born 1914), footballer
Wes Newton (born 1977), darts player
Michael Page (born 1941), cricketer
Jack Parkinson (1869–1911), footballer
Wilfred Proctor, footballer
Jesse Pye (1919–1984), footballer
Joe Riley (born 1996), footballer 
James Schofield (born 1978), cricketer
Len Stephenson (born 1930), footballer
Frank Swift (1913–1958), footballer
David Tong (born 1955), footballer
Albert Turner (1901–1985), footballer
Roger Uttley (born 1949), rugby player
Ted Wade (born 1901), footballer
Dennis Wann (born 1950), footballer
Mark Westhead (born 1975), footballer
Daniel Whiston (born 1976), ice skater
Derek Woodman, motorcycle racer
Shelly Woods (born 1986), wheelchair racer

Miscellaneous
Cynthia Lennon (born 1939), first wife of musician John Lennon
Louisa May Merrifield (1906-1953), poisoner
Rachel McLean (1971–1991), murder victim

References

Blackpool
 
People From Blackpool